Matelita Vuakoso is a Fijian footballer who plays as a goalkeeper. She has been a member of the Fiji women's national team.

Notes

References

Living people
Women's association football goalkeepers
Fijian women's footballers
Fiji women's international footballers
Year of birth missing (living people)